Lago Vista Independent School District is a school district headquartered in Lago Vista, Texas, in the Austin metropolitan area.

Darren Webb is the current Superintendent of the district. Schools in the Lago Vista Independent School District include Lago Vista Elementary School, Lago Vista Intermediate School, Lago Vista Middle School, and Lago Vista High School.

The district serves almost of Lago Vista and all of Point Venture, as well as portions of nearby Jonestown. The school district's current UIL Classification is 4A, Division 2. In total, the Lago Vista Independent School District serves just under 2,000 students. Enrollment is projected to increase to approximately 2,500 students by the 2026 school year as the area's population continues to grow at a rapid pace.  In recent years, Lago Vista voters have approved a host of ballot propositions aimed at increasing funding for varying district extracurricular opportunities and improving district facilities. For the 2020-2021 academic school year, the graduation rate for Lago Vista ISD was 100%. The District is one of the top-rated districts in the Central Texas region with a Texas Education Agency (TEA) Accountability Rating of “A".

The Lago Vista Independent School District is governed by the Lago Vista ISD Board of Trustees, which has seven members elected to three year terms. Board members all represesent the district at large rather than specific geographical areas.

Rating
In 2010, the school district was rated "Exemplary" by the Texas Education Agency.

Awards
In 2015, the theatre program at Lago Vista High School claimed the UIL Conference 3-A State One-Act championship with their production of "Over the River and Through the Woods." The show was directed by first-year teacher, Elisabeth Hunter.

The Lago Vista Vikings have become a very successful program in football, where they have won 3 district championships and played in the state semi-finals against Cameron at DKR Memorial Stadium. They are coached by Alan Haire.

Gallery

References

External links

Lago Vista ISD

School districts in Travis County, Texas